Pavel Šrek (born December 17, 1967) is a Czech former professional ice hockey defenceman. He is currently working as the Director of Player Development for HC Sparta Praha.

Šrek played in the Czechoslovak First Ice Hockey League and the Czech Extraliga with HC Sparta Praha and HC Plzeň. He played a total of 557 games for Sparta Praha in twelve seasons and won a league championship with the team in 2002. He also played one season in the Japan Ice Hockey League for Sapporo Snow Brand during the 1996–97 season.

On May 15, 2020, it was announced by Sparta Praha that Šrek would move into a new role with the team as their Director of Player Development.

References

External links

1967 births
Living people
BK Mladá Boleslav players
Czech ice hockey defencemen
IHC Písek players
HC Plzeň players
HC Slezan Opava players
HC Sparta Praha players
HC Tábor players
Czechoslovak ice hockey defencemen
Czech expatriate ice hockey people
Czech expatriate sportspeople in Japan
Expatriate ice hockey players in Japan